The Journal of Modern Greek Studies is an academic journal founded in 1983, and is the official publication of the Modern Greek Studies Association. It is devoted to the study of social, cultural, and political affairs in modern Greece, defined as the late Byzantine period to the present. The journal covers historical, literary, anthropological, artistic, and other aspects of contemporary Greek society. The current editor is Maria Koundoura of Emerson College. The journal is published biannually, in May and October, by the Johns Hopkins University Press.

External links 
 
 Journal of Modern Greek Studies at Project MUSE
 Modern Greek Studies Association website

Modern Greek studies
European studies journals
Publications established in 1983
Johns Hopkins University Press academic journals
Biannual journals
English-language journals